In mathematics, the fundamental theorem of arithmetic, also called the unique factorization theorem and prime factorization theorem, states that every integer greater than 1 can be represented uniquely as a product of prime numbers, up to the order of the factors. For example,

The theorem says two things about this example: first, that 1200  be represented as a product of primes, and second, that no matter how this is done, there will always be exactly four 2s, one 3, two 5s, and no other primes in the product.

The requirement that the factors be prime is necessary: factorizations containing composite numbers may not be unique 
(for example).

This theorem is one of the main reasons why 1 is not considered a prime number: if 1 were prime, then factorization into primes would not be unique; for example, 

The theorem generalizes to other algebraic structures that are called unique factorization domains and include principal ideal domains, Euclidean domains, and polynomial rings over a field. However, the theorem does not hold for algebraic integers. This failure of unique factorization is one of the reasons for the difficulty of the proof of Fermat's Last Theorem. The implicit use of unique factorization in rings of algebraic integers is behind the error of many of the numerous false proofs that have been written during the 358 years between Fermat's statement and Wiles's proof.

History

The fundamental theorem can be derived from Book VII, propositions 30, 31 and 32, and Book IX, proposition 14 of Euclid's Elements.

(In modern terminology: if a  prime p divides the product ab, then p divides either a or b or both.) Proposition 30 is referred to as Euclid's lemma, and it is the key in the proof of the fundamental theorem of arithmetic.

(In modern terminology: every integer greater than one is divided evenly by some prime number.) Proposition 31 is proved directly by infinite descent.

Proposition 32 is derived from proposition 31, and proves that the decomposition is possible.

(In modern terminology: a least common multiple of several prime numbers is not a multiple of any other prime number.) Book IX, proposition 14 is derived from Book VII, proposition 30, and proves partially that the decomposition is unique – a point critically noted by André Weil. Indeed, in this proposition the exponents are all equal to one, so nothing is said for the general case.

While Euclid took the first step on the way to the existence of prime factorization, Kamāl al-Dīn al-Fārisī took the final step and stated for the first time the fundamental theorem of arithmetic.

Article 16 of Gauss' Disquisitiones Arithmeticae is an early modern statement and proof employing modular arithmetic.

Applications

Canonical representation of a positive integer 

Every positive integer  can be represented in exactly one way as a product of prime powers

This representation is commonly extended to all positive integers, including 1, by the convention that the empty product is equal to 1 (the empty product corresponds to ).

For example,

999 = 33×37,
1000 = 23×53,
1001 = 7×11×13.

In fact, any positive integer can be uniquely represented as an infinite product taken over all the positive prime numbers, as

Allowing negative exponents provides a canonical form for positive rational numbers.

Arithmetic operations
The canonical representations of the product, greatest common divisor (GCD), and least common multiple (LCM) of two numbers a and b can be expressed simply in terms of the canonical representations of a and b themselves:

However, integer factorization, especially of large numbers, is much more difficult than computing products, GCDs, or LCMs.  So these formulas have limited use in practice.

Arithmetic functions

Many arithmetic functions are defined using the canonical representation. In particular, the values of additive and multiplicative functions are determined by their values on the powers of prime numbers.

Proof
The proof uses Euclid's lemma (Elements VII, 30): If a prime divides the product of two integers, then it must divide at least one of these integers.

Existence
First,  is prime. If  is prime, there is nothing more to prove. But then  is a product of primes.

Uniqueness
Suppose, to the contrary, there is an integer that has two distinct prime factorizations. Without loss of generality, say  divides .

Uniqueness without Euclid's lemma
The fundamental theorem of arithmetic can also be proved without using Euclid's lemma. The proof that follows is inspired by Euclid's original version of the Euclidean algorithm. 

Assume that  is the smallest positive integer which is the product of prime numbers in two different ways. Now, say 

One may also suppose that  by exchanging the two factorizations, if needed.

Setting  and  one has 
Also, since  one has 
It then follows that

Therefore, there cannot exist a smallest integer with more than a single distinct prime factorization. Every positive integer must either be a prime number itself, which would factor uniquely, or a composite that also factors uniquely into primes, or in the case of the integer , not factor into any prime.

Generalizations
The first generalization of the theorem is found in Gauss's second monograph (1832) on biquadratic reciprocity. This paper introduced what is now called the ring of Gaussian integers, the set of all complex numbers a + bi where a and b are integers. It is now denoted by  He showed that this ring has the four units ±1 and ±i, that the non-zero, non-unit numbers fall into two classes, primes and composites, and that (except for order), the composites have unique factorization as a product of primes.

Similarly, in 1844 while working on cubic reciprocity, Eisenstein introduced the ring , where     is a cube root of unity. This is the ring of Eisenstein integers, and he proved it has the six units  and that it has unique factorization.

However, it was also discovered that unique factorization does not always hold. In this ring one has

Examples like this caused the notion of "prime" to be modified. In  it can be proven that if any of the factors above can be represented as a product, for example, 2 = ab, then one of a or b must be a unit. This is the traditional definition of "prime". It can also be proven that none of these factors obeys Euclid's lemma; for example, 2 divides neither (1 + ) nor (1 − ) even though it divides their product 6. Euclid's classical lemma can be rephrased as "in the ring of integers  every irreducible is prime".

The rings in which factorization into irreducibles is essentially unique are called unique factorization domains. Important examples are polynomial rings over the integers or over a field, Euclidean domains and principal ideal domains.

In 1843 Kummer introduced the concept of ideal number, which was developed further by Dedekind (1876) into the modern theory of ideals, special subsets of rings. Multiplication is defined for ideals, and the rings in which they have unique factorization are called Dedekind domains.

There is a version of unique factorization for ordinals, though it requires some additional conditions to ensure uniqueness.

See also

Notes

References

The Disquisitiones Arithmeticae has been translated from Latin into English and German. The German edition includes all of his papers on number theory: all the proofs of quadratic reciprocity, the determination of the sign of the Gauss sum, the investigations into biquadratic reciprocity, and unpublished notes.
 
 

The two monographs Gauss published on biquadratic reciprocity have consecutively numbered sections: the first contains §§ 1–23 and the second §§ 24–76. Footnotes referencing these are of the form "Gauss, BQ, § n". Footnotes referencing the Disquisitiones Arithmeticae are of the form "Gauss, DA, Art. n".
 
 

These are in Gauss's Werke, Vol II, pp. 65–92 and 93–148; German translations are pp. 511–533 and 534–586 of the German edition of the Disquisitiones.
 
 
 .
 .

External links 
 Why isn’t the fundamental theorem of arithmetic obvious?
 GCD and the Fundamental Theorem of Arithmetic at cut-the-knot.
 PlanetMath: Proof of fundamental theorem of arithmetic
 Fermat's Last Theorem Blog: Unique Factorization, a blog that covers the history of Fermat's Last Theorem from Diophantus of Alexandria to the proof by Andrew Wiles.
 "Fundamental Theorem of Arithmetic" by Hector Zenil, Wolfram Demonstrations Project, 2007.
 

Theorems about prime numbers
Articles containing proofs
Uniqueness theorems
factorization

de:Primfaktorzerlegung#Fundamentalsatz der Arithmetik